Thulli Thirintha Kaalam is a 1998 Tamil drama film directed by Balasekaran and produced by K. Balachander. The film stars Arun Vijay (known at the time as Arunkumar) and Khushbu, while Roshini, Raghuvaran, and Karan play supporting roles. The film, which had music composed by Jayanth, opened in March 1998 to positive reviews.

Plot
Four youths who are good for nothing veil away their time doing nothing. Their parents too are fed up with their irresponsible behavior. Kausalya comes to live in their neighborhood. Seeing their lifestyle and behavior, she decides to teach them a lesson.

Cast

Soundtrack 
Soundtrack was composed by Jayanth and lyrics by Vaasan and Dr. Kruthaya.
"Deewana" - Mano, Pop Shalini
"Mannil Enna" - Mano, Malgudi Subha
"Azhage" - K. S. Chithra
"Kowsalya" - Harini, Baby Deepika
"Tak Tak Tak" - P. Unnikrishnan, Sujatha, Nandha, Grubb
"Vaarthai Enna" - Mano

Release

The film opened to positive reviews with a critic from Indolink.com noting "this K. Balachandar production has nothing new or different to offer but provides an old youth-advice masala with some sentiment pickle, sweet comedy and songs". A critic from Dinakaran noted "this film is a milestone that speaks well of the newly set-in trend in Tamil field created by the young generation directors".

The film became a commercial success, prompting Telugu and Manipuri versions (Amada Mari) of the film to be produced. Telugu remake titled Ammayi Kosam had Ravi Teja and Meena in lead roles.

References

External links

1998 films
1990s coming-of-age drama films
Indian coming-of-age drama films
Tamil films remade in other languages
1990s Tamil-language films
Films directed by Balasekaran